Lac de Gérardmer is a glacial lake at the city of Gérardmer, Vosges, France. It is located in the Vosges mountain range at an elevation of 660 m. With a surface area of 1.16 km² it is the largest natural lake in the Vosges mountain range.

References

External links 
Le lac de Gérardmer - video of the lake side
Lac de Gérardmer at elsass-netz.de (German)

Gerardmer
Gerardmer
LGerardmer